The Awaken Punch (Chinese: 石破天惊, also known as 红狼醒拳) is a 1973 Hong Kong martial arts film directed by Fong Lung-Seung. The film is as an early example of Yuen Wo Ping's fight choreography and features Jackie Chan as an extra.

Plot
Henry yu Young  plays a young man, Cheung Da Gong, who travels from place to place earning a living as a fighter. He fights at times on a stage before spectators, as a hired body guard and altruistically to protect shopkeepers from thugs looking to collect protection money.

One day Cheung receives a letter which prompts him to return home where his elderly father is sick and dying. At his father's death bed Cheung vows at his father's behest to stay and work his family's farm and to give up fighting.

Local gangsters try to buy Cheung's land and when Cheung refuses attempt to intimidate him first through threats and then by burning down his house, killing Cheung's sister and mother in the process.

Cheung motivated by revenge hunts down the gangsters eventually tracking down their leader and killing him. The movie ends with Cheung submitting to the local authorities when he is arrested on charges of murder with the local deputy admonishing him, "You should have left retribution to the law."

Cast
Henry Yu Yung as Cheung Da Gong
Au-Yeung Pui San as Jun Shen
Tien Feng as Mr. Wong
Mang Lee as brothel Madam
Kenneth Tsang Goes to Law
Suen Lam as Commissioner 
San Kuai as Li (Black Fan)
Fong Yau as Pai (White Fan)
Fung Hark-On as one of the main thug
Lee Chiu as one of the main thug

Extras
Yuen Woo-ping
Yuen Cheung-yan
Yuen Shun-yi
Yuen Chun Wei
Hsu Hsia
Lee Hang
Jackie Chan
Yuen Wah
Yuen Biao
Alan Chui Chung-San
Alan Chan Kwok Kuen
Mars
Wynn Lau Chun Fai
Tang Tak Cheung
Joe Cheung
Kong Cheun
Chan Siu Kai
Chin Yuet Sang

References

External links
The Awaken Punch at Hkmdb

Best Ten Jackie Chan Movies

1973 films
1973 action films
Hong Kong martial arts films
Kung fu films
Chinese martial arts films
1970s Mandarin-language films
1970s Hong Kong films